Censorship in India has taken various forms throughout its history. Although the Constitution of India de jure guarantees freedom of expression, de facto there are various certain restrictions on content, with an official view towards "maintaining communal and religious harmony", given the history of communal tension in the nation. According to the Information Technology Rules 2011, objectionable content includes anything that "threatens the unity, integrity, defence, security or sovereignty of India, friendly relations with foreign states or public order".

In 2021, the Freedom in the World report by Freedom House gave India a Civil Liberties Rating of 33/60. In the subcategories, India got a rating of 2/4 on 'free and independent media', 2/4 on 'individual's freedom to practice and express their religious faith or non-belief in public and private', and a score of 2/4 on 'academic freedom, and the educational system's freedom from extensive political indoctrination'. In 2016, the report Freedom by Freedom House gave India a press freedom rating of "Partly Free", with a Press Freedom Score of 41 (0-100 scale, lower is better). Analysts from Reporters Without Borders rank India 142nd in the world in their 2022 Press Freedom Index, classifying it as a "Difficult" situation.

Laws

Obscenity
Watching, listening or possessing pornographic materials is generally legal, however distribution of such materials is strictly banned. The Central Board of Film Certification allows release of certain films with sexual content (labelled A-rated), which are to be shown only in restricted spaces and to be viewed only by people of age 18 and above. India's public television broadcaster, Doordarshan, has aired these films at late-night time slots. Films, television shows and music videos are prone to scene cuts or even bans, however, if any literature is banned, it is not usually for pornographic reasons. Pornographic magazines are technically illegal, but many softcore Indian publications are available through many news vendors, who often stock them at the bottom of a stack of non-pornographic magazines, and make them available on request. Most non-Indian publications (including Playboy) are usually harder to find, whether soft-core or hardcore. Mailing pornographic magazines in India from a country where they are legal is also illegal in India. In practice, the magazines are almost always confiscated by Customs and entered as evidence of law-breaking and are punishable, which then undergoes detailed scrutiny.

National security
The Official Secrets Act 1923 is used for the protection of official information, mainly related to national security.

Censorship by medium

Press
The Indian press does not enjoy extensive freedom. In 2019, it was ranked 140 in the Press Freedom Index, published by Reporters Without Borders. In 1975, the Indira Gandhi government imposed censorship of press during The Emergency; the day after, the Bombay edition of The Times of India in its obituary column carried an entry that reads, "D.E.M O'Cracy beloved husband of T.Ruth, father of L.I.Bertie, brother of Faith, Hope and Justica expired on 26 June". It was removed at the end of emergency rule in March 1977.

On 2 October 2016 (see: 2016 Kashmir unrest) the Srinagar-based Kashmiri newspaper, Kashmir Reader was asked to stop production by the Jammu and Kashmir government. The ban order, issued by the Deputy Commissioner of Srinagar Farooq Ahmad Lone cited that the reason for this was that the newspaper contains "material and content which tends to incite acts of violence and disturb public peace and tranquility" The ban came after weeks of unrest in the Kashmir valley, following the killing of the commander of a terrorist group Hizbul Mujahideen (designated a terrorist group by India, the European Union and the United States) Burhan Wani. Journalists have decried this as a clampdown on freedom of expression and democracy in Kashmir, as a part of the massive media censorship of the unrest undertaken by the central government. Working journalists protested the ban by marching to the Directorate of Information and Public Relations while the Kashmir Editors Guild (KEG) held an emergency meeting in Srinagar, thereafter asking the government to revoke the ban immediately, and asking for the intervention of the Press Council of India. The move has been criticised by a variety of individuals, academic and civil groups in Kashmir and international rights groups, such as Jammu and Kashmir Coalition of Civil Society (JKCCS), Kashmir Economic Alliance (KEA), the Kashmir Center for Social and Development Studies (KCSDS) and Amnesty International, among others. Most of the major Kashmiri dailies have also rallied behind the KR, while claiming that the move represented a political vendetta against the newspaper for reporting events in the unrest as they happened on the ground. Hurriyat leaders, known to champion the cause of Kashmiri independence, also recorded their protests against the banning of the newspaper. Amnesty International released a statement saying that "the government has a duty to respect the freedom of the press, and the right of people to receive information," while criticising the government for shutting down a newspaper for opposing it. The journalists associated with the paper allege that, contrary to the claims of the J&K government, they had not been issued a notice or warning, and had been asked to stop production suddenly, which was only one manifestation of the wider media gag on Kashmir. Previously, the state government had banned newspapers for a few days in July, calling the move a "temporary measure to address an extraordinary situation", only to deflect the blame onto the police upon facing a tremendous backlash, and thereafter asking the presses to resume publication. On 28 December 2016, the newspaper resumed publication after the government lifted the ban after nearly three months.

Obscenity and defamation
In 1988, a "defamation bill" was introduced by Rajiv Gandhi, but it was later withdrawn due to strong opposition. The Supreme Court while delivering the judgement in Sportsworld case in 2014 held that "A picture of a nude/semi-nude woman ... cannot per se be called obscene".

Kashmir
India’s government requires that all maps in publications circulated in India reflect its claim to the entire region of Kashmir, which is disputed by Pakistan, and regardless of current lines of control. Publications that do not conform are seized by the authorities and issues can end up being destroyed.

Film

The Central Board of Film Certification (CBFC), the regulatory film body of India, regularly orders directors to remove anything it seems offensive, including sex, nudity, violence or subjects considered politically subversive.

According to the Supreme Court of India:

In 2002, the film War and Peace, depicting scenes of nuclear testing and the 11 September 2001 attacks, created by Anand Patwardhan, was asked to make 21 cuts before it was allowed to have the certificate for release. Patwardhan objected, saying "The cuts that they asked for are so ridiculous that they won't hold up in court" and "But if these cuts do make it, it will be the end of freedom of expression in the Indian media." The court decreed the cuts unconstitutional and the film was shown uncut.

In 2002, the Indian filmmaker and former chief of the country's film censor board, Vijay Anand, kicked up a controversy with a proposal to legalise the exhibition of X-rated films in selected cinemas across the country, saying "Porn is shown everywhere in India clandestinely ... and the best way to fight this onslaught of blue movies is to show them openly in theatres with legally authorised licences". He resigned within a year after taking charge of the censor board after facing widespread criticism of his moves.

In 2003, the Indian Censor Board banned the film Gulabi Aaina (The Pink Mirror), a film on Indian transsexuals produced and directed by Sridhar Rangayan. The censor board cited that the film was "vulgar and offensive". The filmmaker appealed twice again unsuccessfully. The film still remains banned in India, but has screened at numerous festivals all over the world and won awards. The critics have applauded it for its "sensitive and touching portrayal of marginalised community".

In 2004, the documentary Final Solution, which looks at religious rioting between Hindus and Muslims, was banned. The film follows 2002 clashes in the western state of Gujarat, which left more than 1,000 people dead. The censor board justified the ban, saying it was "highly provocative and may trigger off unrest and communal violence". The ban was lifted in October 2004 after a sustained campaign.

In 2006, seven states (Nagaland, Punjab, Goa, Tamil Nadu, Andhra Pradesh) have banned the release or exhibition of the Hollywood movie The Da Vinci Code (and also the book), although the CBFC cleared the film for adult viewing throughout India. However, the respective high courts lifted the ban and the movie was shown in the two states.

The CBFC demanded five cuts from the 2011 American film The Girl with the Dragon Tattoo because of some scenes containing rape and nudity. The producers and the director David Fincher finally decided not to release the film in India.

In 2013, Kamal Haasan's Vishwaroopam was banned from the screening for a period of two weeks in Tamil Nadu.

In 2014 the investigative documentary No Fire Zone: In the Killing Fields of Sri Lanka on the by Callum Macrae  was refused certification by the Central Board of Film Certification as it would damage India-Sri Lanka relationship.

In 2015, the CBFC demanded four cuts (three visual and one audio) from the art-house Malayalam feature film Chaayam Poosiya Veedu (The Painted House) directed by brothers Santosh Babusenan and Satish Babusenan because the film contained scenes where the female lead was shown in the nude. The directors refused to make any changes whatsoever to the film and hence the film was denied a certificate.
In 2015 noted documentary film makers Jharana Jhaveri And Anurag Singh's Charlie and the Coca Cola Company: Quit India ran into trouble with the CBFC and the case is pending since. In the 20 pages the appellate sited 20 odd objections to the release of the documentary, thought did not suggest a single cut. The two-hour twenty minute documentary exposes the Cola companies of abusing ground water, land, livelihoods, rivers & the laws of the land. The documentary also hold actors & TV guilty and accountable having violated the ethical and moral boundaries for profit over sustainability.

In 2015 Porkalathil Oru Poo a biopic of  Isaipriya  a television journalist raped and murdered by members of the Sri Lankan Army ran into trouble with the Central Board of Film Certification with board refusing to certify the movie as it would damage India-Sri Lanka relationship.

In 2016, the film Udta Punjab, produced by Anurag Kashyap and Ekta Kapoor among others, ran into trouble with the CBFC, resulting in a very public re-examination of the ethics of film censorship in India. The film, which depicted a structural drug problem in the state of Punjab, used a lot of expletives and showed scenes of drug use. The CBFC, on 9 June 2016, released a list of 94 cuts and 13 pointers, including the deletion of names of cities in Punjab. On 13 June, the film was cleared by the Bombay High Court with one cut and disclaimers. The court ruled that, contrary to the claims of the CBFC, the film was not out to "malign" the state of Punjab, and that it "wants to save people". Thereafter, the film was faced with further controversy when a print of it was leaked online on a torrent site. The quality of the copy, along with the fact that there was supposedly a watermark that said "censor" on top of the screen, raised suspicions that the CBFC itself had leaked the copy to spite the filmmakers. It also contained the only scene that had been cut according to the High Court order. While the CBFC claimed innocence, the lingering suspicions resulted in a tense release, with the filmmakers and countless freedom of expression advocates taking to social media to appeal to the public to watch the film in theatres, as a conscious challenge against excessive censorship on art in India. Kashyap, in a Facebook post, urged viewers to wait till the film released before they downloaded it for free, stating that "Piracy happens because of lack of access and in a world of free internet, i do not have a problem with it.". The film eventually released and grossed over $13 million finishing as a commercial success.

In 2017, the film Lipstick Under My Burkha directed by Alankrita Shrivastava and produced by Prakash Jha, also ran into trouble with the Central Board of Film Certification refused to certify the film, stating that "The story is lady oriented, their fantasy above life. There are contagious [sic] sexual scenes, abusive words, audio pornography and a bit sensitive touch about one particular section of society." Internationally, the film has been screened in over 35 film festivals across the world and notably earned eleven international awards prior to its official release in India, becoming eligible entry for the Golden Globe Award Ceremony. The filmmakers appealed this decision to the Film Certification Appellate Tribunal (FCAT), which overruled the censor board's ruling, thereby granting the film a theatrical release rights. FCAT asked the filmmakers to make some cuts, mostly related to the sex scenes, at their discretion. The film was released with an "A" or adults certificate, equivalent to an NC-17 rating in the United States, with some voluntary edits. Shrivastava told Agence-France Presse: "Of course I would have loved no cuts, but the FCAT has been very fair and clear. I feel that we will be able to release the film without hampering the narrative or diluting its essence."

In 2017 Neelam a film based on the Sri Lankan Civil War and the rise of the Tamil Groups including the LTTE  ran into trouble with the Central Board of Film Certification with board refusing to certify the movie as it would damage India-Sri Lanka relationship.

In 2018, the film No Fathers in Kashmir directed by Ashvin Kumar hit a roadblock with the Central Board of Film Certification. His two previous documentaries, Inshallah, Football and Inshallah, Kashmir were first banned and then, subsequently, awarded National Awards. Kumar has written an open letter to Prasoon Joshi stating that being awarded an A certificate for an independent film is "as good as banning the film". The filmmaker has appealed to the Film Certification Appellate Tribunal (FCAT).

Television 

In February 2013, in the wake of controversy over suspension of exhibition of the film, Vishwaroopam, the Ministry of Information & Broadcasting constituted a panel under the Chairmanship of Justice (Retd.) Mukul Mudgal to examine issues of film certification under the Cinematograph Act 1952. One of the terms of reference for the committee is to examine "the requirement of special categories of certification for the purposes of broadcasting on television channels and radio stations." But, the committee had not made any recommendations on this important matter.

The current classifications of films in India are as follows:
 अ / U – unrestricted public exhibition;
 अ/व / U/A – unrestricted public exhibition, but with a caution regarding parental guidance to those under 12 years of age;
 व / A – public exhibition restricted to adults 18 years of age and older only;
 S – public exhibition restricted to members of a profession or a class of persons (e.g. doctors etc.)—very rare.

Music
Thrash metal band Slayer's 2006 album Christ Illusion was banned in India after Catholic churches in the country took offense to the artwork of the album and a few song titles and launched a protest against it. The album was taken off shelves and the remaining catalog was burnt by EMI Music India.

Dramas
In 1978, Kiran Nagarkar wrote the play Bedtime Story, based partly on the Mahābhārata. Its performance was extra-legally banned for 17 years by Hindu nationalist fundamentalist parties, including the Shiv Sena, a far-right political party; Rashtriya Swayamsevak Sangh (RSS) and Hindu Mahasabha.

In 1999, Maharashtra government banned the Marathi play Me Nathuram Godse Boltoy or I, Nathuram Godse, Am Speaking The Notification was challenged before the Bombay High Court, and the High Court Bench consisting of B. P. Singh (Chief Justice), S. Radhakrishnan, and Dr. D. Y. Chandrachud allowed the writ petition and declared the notification to be ultra vires and illegal, thus rescinding the ban.

In 2004, Eve Ensler's The Vagina Monologues was banned in Chennai. The play however, has played successfully in many other parts of the country since 2003. A Hindi version of the play has been performing since 2007.

Maps
In 1961, it was criminalised in India to question the territorial integrity of frontiers of India in a manner which is, or is likely to be, prejudicial to the interests of the safety or security of India.

Books

Several books of the Bangladeshi writer Taslima Nasrin have been banned in West Bengal.
 1989, The import of Salman Rushdie's The Satanic Verses was banned in India for its purported attacks on Islam. India was the second country in the world (after Singapore) to ban the book.
 1990, Understanding Islam through Hadis by Ram Swarup was banned. In 1990 the Hindi translation of the book was banned, and in March 1991 the English original became banned as well.
 Shivaji: Hindu King in Islamic India by American scholar James Laine was banned in 2004.
 Laine's translation of the 300-year-old poem Sivabharata, entitled The Epic of Shivaji, was banned in January 2006. The ban followed an attack by Sambhaji Brigade activists on the Bhandarkar Oriental Research Institute in Pune. The subsequent governments have not revoked the ban.
 In Punjab the Bhavsagar Granth (Bhavsagar Samunder Amrit Vani Granth), a 2,704-page religious treatise was banned by the state government in 2001, following clashes between mainstream Sikhs and the apostate Sikh sect that produced it. It was said that the granth had copied a number of portions from the Guru Granth Sahib. In one of the photographs it showed Baba Bhaniara, wearing a shining coat and headdress in a style similar to that made familiar through the popular posters of Guru Gobind Singh, the tenth guru of the Sikhs. In another Baba Bhaniara is shown riding a horse in the manner of Guru Gobind Singh. The ban was lifted in November 2008.
 The Polyester Prince, a biography of the Indian businessman Dhirubhai Ambani was banned.
 Importing the book The True Furqan (al-Furqan al-Haqq) by Al Saffee and Al Mahdee into India has been prohibited since September 2005.
 R.V. Bhasin's Islam - A Concept of Political World Invasion by Muslims was banned in Maharashtra in 2007 during the tenure of Vilasrao Deshmukh (ex Chief Minister, Maharashtra) on grounds that it promotes communal disharmony between Hindus and Muslims.

Internet

Freedom House's Freedom on the Net 2015 report gives India a Freedom on the Net Status of "Partly Free" with a rating of 40 (scale from 0 to 100, lower is better). Its Obstacles to Access was rated 12 (0-25 scale), Limits on Content was rated 10 (0-35 scale) and Violations of User Rights was rated 18 (0-40 scale). India was ranked 29th out of the 65 countries included in the 2015 report.

The Freedom on the Net 2012 report says:
 India's overall Internet Freedom Status is "Partly Free", unchanged from 2009.
 India has a score of 39 on a scale from 0 (most free) to 100 (least free), which places India 20 out of the 47 countries worldwide that were included in the 2012 report. India ranked 14 out of 37 countries in the 2011 report.
 India ranks third out of the eleven countries in Asia included in the 2012 report.
 Prior to 2008, censorship of Internet content by the Indian government was relatively rare and sporadic.
 Following the November 2008 terrorist attacks in Mumbai, which killed 171 people, the Indian Parliament passed amendments to the Information Technology Act (ITA) that expanded the government's censorship and monitoring capabilities.
 While there is no sustained government policy or strategy to block access to Internet content on a large scale, measures for removing certain content from the web, sometimes for fear they could incite violence, have become more common.
 Pressure on private companies to remove information that is perceived to endanger public order or national security has increased since late 2009, with the implementation of the amended ITA. Companies are required to have designated employees to receive government blocking requests, and assigns up to seven years' imprisonment private service providers—including ISPs, search engines, and cybercafes—that do not comply with the government's blocking requests.
 Internet users have sporadically faced prosecution for online postings, and private companies hosting the content are obliged by law to hand over user information to the authorities.
 In 2009, the Supreme Court ruled that bloggers and moderators can face libel suits and even criminal prosecution for comments posted on their websites.
 Prior judicial approval for communications interception is not required and both central and state governments have the power to issue directives on interception, monitoring, and decryption. All licensed ISPs are obliged by law to sign an agreement that allows Indian government authorities to access user data.

India is classified as engaged in "selective" Internet filtering in the conflict/security and Internet tools areas and as showing "no evidence" of filtering in the political and social areas by the OpenNet Initiative in May 2007. ONI states that:
As a stable democracy with strong protections for press freedom, India’s experiments with Internet filtering have been brought into the fold of public discourse. The selective censorship of Web sites and blogs since 2003, made even more disjointed by the non-uniform responses of Internet service providers (ISPs), has inspired a clamour of opposition. Clearly government regulation and implementation of filtering are still evolving. … Amidst widespread speculation in the media and blogosphere about the state of filtering in India, the sites actually blocked indicate that while the filtering system in place yields inconsistent results, it nevertheless continues to be aligned with and driven by government efforts. Government attempts at filtering have not been entirely effective, as blocked content has quickly migrated to other Web sites and users have found ways to circumvent filtering. The government has also been criticised for a poor understanding of the technical feasibility of censorship and for haphazardly choosing which Web sites to block. The amended IT Act, absolving intermediaries from being responsible for third-party created content, could signal stronger government monitoring in the future.

A "Transparency Report" from Google indicates that the Government of India initiated 67 content removal requests between July and December 2010.

See also

 Ethical Code for Digital News Websites
 Freedom of the press in British India
 Television content rating systems in India
 List of films banned in India
 List of books banned in India
 Pornography laws in India
 Internet censorship in India
 Central Board of Film Certification, the Indian film classification and censorship body

References 

Further reading
Chandmal Chopra and Sita Ram Goel. 1987. The Calcutta Quran Petition. New Delhi: Voice of India.
Elst, Koenraad. 1992. 'Negationism in India: Concealing the Record of Islam'.
Arun Shourie, Ram Swarup, and Goel, Sita Ram Goel, 1998. Freedom of expression: secular theocracy versus liberal democracy.

External links 
Freedom of Expression in India, International Freedom of Expression Exchange (IFEX).
Devika Sethi, War over Words: Censorship in India, 1930-60 (Cambridge University Press, 2019).

 
Politics of India